The International Society for Industrial Ecology (ISIE) is an international professional association with the aim of promoting the development and application of industrial ecology.

History

The decision to found ISIE was made in January 2000 at the New York Academy of Sciences in a meeting devoted to industrial ecology attended by experts from diverse fields. The society formally opened its doors to membership in February 2001.

Membership

ISIE offers different types of membership that can be purchased from the Wiley-Blackwell website. Members get access to 6 issues of the Journal of Industrial Ecology published by Wiley-Blackwell on behalf of Yale University, as well as discounts for attending ISIE biennial conferences and discounts on books published by Wiley-Blackwell.

Recent conferences of ISIE have been held at locations such as the University of Ulsan in South Korea, Melbourne, Australia, University of California, Berkeley, and Stockholm Environmental Institute.

References

External links

Industrial ecology
International professional associations
International sustainability organizations
Organizations established in 2001
Organizations based in New Haven, Connecticut